Shionoya (written: 塩谷 or 塩ノ谷) is a Japanese surname. Notable people with the surname include:

, Japanese politician
, Japanese singer

Japanese-language surnames